Més Compromís, was an electoral coalition formed by Coalició Compromís and Más País in September 2019 to contest that year's November general election in the Valencian Community. The agreement between Más País and Compromís implied respecting the latter's lists from the previous election, maintaining Compromís' electoral manifesto and granting autonomy to Joan Baldoví's group in the Congress of Deputies.

Composition

Electoral performance

Cortes Generales

Notes

References

Political parties established in 2019
Political parties in the Valencian Community
2019 establishments in the Valencian Community
Más País